Abdelali Bouazzaoui (Arabic : عبد العالي بوعزاوي, born 13 May 1991) is a Moroccan runner and trainer. He topped the charts in the Men’s Pocari Sweat 10 km run in 2020.

Early career
Born in El Hajeb, Bouazzaoui started out in Taikwando in 1997 at the age of 6, and then moved to Basketball in 2006, only to find out later that his true passion is running. He got his first bronze medal, when he participated in his university competition. In 2008, Bouazzaoui decided to become a professional runner and joined a local club named اشبال الإسماعيلية in Meknes.

Competitions 
Bouazzaoui won many national and local competitions in his home country Morocco. He took part in many races abroad, and most of them were in the UAE. In 2019, Bouazzaoui competed in NAS Sports Tournament 10-km run and was second to cross the line . In 2020, Bouazzaoui competed in the Pocari Sweat 10km Run, which was held in Dubai at that time, and got his first gold medal. 

Bouazzaoui participated in the same year in the Abu Dhabi Sports Council’s Community Race, and along with a fellow Moroccan runner filled the top two spots in the 10-kilometre run.
 the half marathon muscat . Inyasi Sulley from Tanzania won the race with an impressive time 1 hour and 3 minutes, closely followed by Issac Kibetfrom Ugandain1 hour and 4 minutes. Abdelali Bouazzaoui from Morocco finished third in a time of 1 hour and 6 minutes.

Personal life 
At the moment, Bouazzaoui resides in the United Arab Emirates, and works as a personal trainer to many Emirati athletes. He has been working as a trainer in the UAE Armed Forces since 2014, and an ambassador for the brand Asics since 2020.

References 

Moroccan male long-distance runners
1991 births
Living people
20th-century Moroccan people
21st-century Moroccan people
https://moroccolive.net/2022/07/01/the-successful-multitalented-personality-abdelali-bouazzaoui-is-a-professional-runner-coach-influencer-and-entrepreneur/

https://www.instagram.com/abdelali_bouazzaoui/

https://www.mc-doualiya.com